Barry James Marshall  (born 30 September 1951) is an Australian physician, Nobel Prize Laureate in Physiology or Medicine, Professor of Clinical Microbiology and Co-Director of the Marshall Centre at the University of Western Australia. Marshall and Robin Warren showed that the bacterium Helicobacter pylori (H. pylori) plays a major role in causing many peptic ulcers, challenging decades of medical doctrine holding that ulcers were caused primarily by stress, spicy foods, and too much acid. This discovery has allowed for a breakthrough in understanding a causative link between Helicobacter pylori infection and stomach cancer.

Education and early life
Marshall was born in Kalgoorlie, Western Australia and lived in Kalgoorlie and Carnarvon until moving to Perth at the age of eight. His father held various jobs, and his mother was a nurse. He is the eldest of four siblings. He attended Newman College for his secondary education and the University of Western Australia School of Medicine, where he received a Bachelor of Medicine, Bachelor of Surgery (MBBS) in 1974.  He married his wife Adrienne in 1972 and has four children.

Career and research
In 1979, Marshall was appointed Registrar in Medicine at the Royal Perth Hospital. He met Dr. Robin Warren, a pathologist interested in gastritis, during internal medicine fellowship training at Royal Perth Hospital in 1981. Together, they both studied the presence of spiral bacteria in association with gastritis. In 1982, they performed the initial culture of H. pylori and developed their hypothesis on the bacterial cause of peptic ulcers and gastric cancer. It has been claimed that the H. pylori theory was ridiculed by established scientists and doctors, who did not believe that any bacteria could live in the acidic environment of the stomach. Marshall was quoted as saying in 1998 that "everyone was against me, but I knew I was right." On the other hand, it has also been argued that medical researchers showed a proper degree of scientific scepticism until the H. pylori hypothesis could be supported by evidence.

In 1982 Marshall and Warren obtained funding for one year of research. The first 30 out of 100 samples showed no support for their hypothesis. However, it was discovered that the lab technicians had been throwing out the cultures after two days. This was standard practice for throat swabs where other organisms in the mouth rendered cultures unusable after two days. Due to other hospital work, the lab technicians did not have time to immediately throw out the 31st test on the second day, and so it stayed from Thursday through to the following Monday. In that sample, they discovered the presence of H. pylori.  They later found out that H. pylori grow more slowly than two days, and the stomach cultures were not contaminated by other organisms.

In 1983 they submitted their findings thus far to the Gastroenterological Society of Australia, but the reviewers turned their paper down, rating it in the bottom 10% of those they received that year.

After failed attempts to infect piglets in 1984, Sam Wang reported that Marshall, after having a baseline endoscopy done, drank a broth containing cultured H. pylori, expecting to develop, perhaps years later, an ulcer. He was surprised when, only three days later, he developed vague nausea and halitosis, due to the achlorhydria.  There was no acid to kill bacteria in the stomach and their waste products manifested as bad breath, noticed by his wife. On days 5–8, he developed achlorhydric (no acid) vomiting. On day eight, he had a repeat endoscopy, which showed massive inflammation (gastritis), and a biopsy from which H. pylori was cultured, showing it had colonised his stomach. On the fourteenth day after ingestion, a third endoscopy was done, and Marshall began to take antibiotics. Marshall did not develop antibodies to H. pylori, suggesting that innate immunity can sometimes eradicate acute H. pylori infection. Marshall's illness and recovery, based on a culture of organisms extracted from a patient, fulfilled Koch's postulates for H. pylori and gastritis, but not for peptic ulcers. This experiment was published in 1985 in the Medical Journal of Australia and is among the most cited articles from the journal.

After his work at Fremantle Hospital, Marshall did research at Royal Perth Hospital (1985–86) and at the University of Virginia, USA (1986–present), before returning to Australia while remaining on the faculty of the University of Virginia. He held a Burnet Fellowship at the University of Western Australia (UWA) from 1998–2003. Marshall continues research related to H. pylori and runs the H. pylori Research Laboratory at UWA.

In 2007, Marshall was appointed Co-Director of The Marshall Centre for Infectious Diseases Research and Training, founded in his honour. In addition to Helicobacter pylori research, the Centre conducted varied research into infectious disease identification and surveillance, diagnostics and drug design, and transformative discovery. His research group expanded to embrace new technologies, including Next-Generation Sequencing and genomic analysis.  Marshall also accepted a part-time appointment at the Pennsylvania State University that same year.  In August 2020, Marshall, along with Simon J. Thorpe, accepted a position at the scientific advisory board of Brainchip INC, a  computer chip  company.

Awards and honours
In 2005, the Karolinska Institute in Stockholm awarded the Nobel Prize in Physiology or Medicine to Marshall and Robin Warren, his long-time collaborator, "for their discovery of the bacterium Helicobacter pylori and its role in gastritis and peptic ulcer disease".

Marshall also received the Warren Alpert Prize in 1994; the Australian Medical Association Award and the Albert Lasker Award for Clinical Medical Research in 1995; the Gairdner Foundation International Award in 1996; the Paul Ehrlich and Ludwig Darmstaedter Prize in 1997; the Golden Plate Award of the American Academy of Achievement, the Dr A.H. Heineken Prize for Medicine, the Florey Medal, and the Buchanan Medal of the Royal Society in 1998.

He was elected a Fellow of the Royal Society (FRS) in 1999.  His certificate of election to the Royal Society reads:

Barry Marshall, together with Robin Warren, discovered spiral bacteria in the stomachs of almost all patients with active chronic gastritis, or duodenal or gastric ulcers, and proposed that the bacteria were an important factor in the aetiology of these diseases. In 1985, Marshall showed by self-administration that this bacterium, now called Helicobacter pylori, causes acute gastritis and suggested that chronic colonisation directly leads to peptic ulceration. These results were a major challenge to the prevailing view that gastric disorders had a physiological basis, rather than being infectious diseases. Marshall showed that antibiotic and bismuth salt regimens that killed H. pylori resulted in the cure of duodenal ulcers. The view that gastric disorders are infectious diseases is now firmly established and there is increasing evidence for a role of H. pylori infection in gastric cancers. The work of Marshall has produced one of the most radical and important changes in medical perception in the last 50 years. Barry Marshall was awarded the Albert Lasker Award for Clinical Science in 1995 and the Buchanan Medal in 1998.

Marshall was awarded the Benjamin Franklin Medal for Life Sciences in 1999; the Keio Medical Science Prize in 2002; and the Australian Centenary Medal and Macfarlane Burnet Medal and Lecture in 2003.

Marshall was appointed a Companion of the Order of Australia in 2007. He was awarded an honorary Doctor of Science degree by the University of Oxford in 2009.

Marshall was elected Fellow of the Australian Academy of Health and Medical Sciences (FAHMS) in 2015.

Marshall was awarded the honour of Western Australian of the Year in 2006.

Marshall was awarded The Companion in the General Division of the Order of Australia (AC) in 2007.

Marshall was awarded The University of Oxford honorary Doctor of Science degree in 2009.

Marshall is the Ambassador for Life Sciences for Western Australia.

See also
 Timeline of peptic ulcer disease and Helicobacter pylori

References

External links

Nobel Prize Inspiration Initiative
  with the Nobel Lecture Helicobacter Connections 
 The Helicobacter Foundation Discussion Pages
 The Helicobacter pylori Research Laboratory
 The Helicobacter Foundation
 Marshall's personal web page
 Interview with Barry Marshall – Radio Live, May 2010.
 Interview with Barry Marshall – BBC World Service 6, 7 and 8 November 2010, Interviewer: Owen Bennett-Jones, Programme series: The Interview.
 The Marshall Centre

1951 births
Living people
Australian microbiologists
Australian Nobel laureates
Companions of the Order of Australia
Winners of the Heineken Prize
Fellows of the Australian Academy of Science
Fellows of the Australian Academy of Health and Medical Sciences
Fellows of the Royal Society
Fellows of the Royal Australasian College of Physicians
Foreign associates of the National Academy of Sciences
Foreign members of the Chinese Academy of Engineering
Nobel laureates in Physiology or Medicine
People educated at Newman College, Perth
People from Kalgoorlie
People from Perth, Western Australia
Scientists from Western Australia
University of Virginia alumni
University of Western Australia alumni
Academic staff of the University of Western Australia
Recipients of the Lasker-DeBakey Clinical Medical Research Award
University of Virginia School of Medicine faculty
Members of the National Academy of Medicine